is a six-episode supernatural action/adventure original video animation (OVA) anime series produced in 1999–2002 by Zexcs and directed by Hikaru Takanashi and Noboru Ishiguro. The series was licensed in English by Media Blasters and broadcast in the United States by Encore Action in 2007.

Story 
Long ago, in Japan's feudal era, an evil lord named the Demon King used his band of demons, the Kyouma, to wreak havoc upon the country. Only the combined bravery of ten warriors could stop him; he was sealed away and the Kyouma put down. But now, Lord Shindigan, one of the surviving Kyouma, plans to free the Demon King from his imprisonment. The reincarnations of the legendary warriors must band together to stop him and save the world.

Characters 
Kyoshiro Kagami: A private inspector in the present, he is the Warrior of the Mirror. 

Hagiri Ranba: A teenage girl who is the Warrior of Fire. 

Jingo Kazamatsuri: A trendy teenage boy; he uses wind attacks. 

Futaba Amitaka: A quiet teenage girl  who uses paper charms. She seems to have a crush on Jutto. 

Farina Nanao: A computer geek who uses mono-fiber threads for her attacks. 

Rokumon Hanawa: A reporter/photographer who uses plants to attack. 

Minawa Narutaki: A blind priest who refuses to accept his destiny. 

Jutto Sego: The Warrior of Light and the main character. 

Kotana Kifu: A country bumpkin who summons a Sacred Beast through her pet mouse, Tsuina. She has a special relationship with Jutto, though neither seems to be willing to admit it. 

Hajime Shirogane: The Warrior of Martial Arts and the former commander of the ten warriors.

Notes

External links 
 
 
 

2004 anime OVAs
Zexcs